Blakeway is an English surname. Notable people by that name include:

 Alan Blakeway (1898-1936), British archaeologist.
 Charles Blakeway (1868-1922), Archdeacon of Stafford.
 Denys Blakeway, British television producer and author.
 Graham Blakeway, rugby league footballer who played in the 1960s.
 Jacob Blakeway, historical figure connected to the Mayflower.
 Phil Blakeway (born 1950), England international rugby union footballer.
 John Brickdale Blakeway (1765–1826), English barrister, cleric and topographer.

English culture